Llulluch'a (Quechua for an edible gelatinous, dark green bacteria (nostocales), also spelled Llullucha) is a  mountain in the Wansu mountain range in the Andes of Peru. It is situated in the Apurímac Region, Antabamba Province, Antabamba District. Llulluch'a lies southwest of Quncha Urqu.

References 

Mountains of Peru
Mountains of Apurímac Region